Haldane is an unincorporated community in Ogle County, Illinois, United States, located south of Forreston and west of Mount Morris.

History 
Haldane had its start in 1858 as a rail station. The community was named for Alexander Haldane, a railroad official.

References 

Unincorporated communities in Ogle County, Illinois
Unincorporated communities in Illinois